Wild Energy. Amazon. Wild Dances is the first DVD compilation by the Ukrainian singer Ruslana.
The DVD contains several of her music clips from 2000 to her recent releases in 2008. Video clips from the "Wild Dances" and "Diki Tantsi" are placed as bonus tracks on the DVD

Track listing

 Presentation video (EPK)

Amazonka
 "Dyka Enerhija"
 Making Of "Dyka Enerhija"
 "Vidlunnya mrij" feat. T-Pain
 Making Of "Vidlunya Mrij"
 "Vohon' chy lid"
 Making Of "Vohon‘ chy lid"
 "Dykyy Anhel"

Wild Energy
 "Teasers"
 "Wild Energy"
 Making of "Wild Energy"
 "Moon of Dreams" feat. T-Pain
 Making of "Moon of Dreams"
 "Silent Angel"

Dyki Tantsi
 "Dyki Tantsi"
 Making Of "Dyki Tantsi"
 "Skazhy Meni"
 Making Of "Skazhy Meni"
 "Oj, Zagraimy, Muzychenku"
 Making Of "Oj, Zagraimy, Muzychenku"
 "Kolomyjka"
 Making Of "Kolomyjka"
 "Znaju Ja"
 Making Of "Znaju Ja"

Wild Dances
 "Wild Dances"
 Making Of "Wild Dances"
 "Dance with the Wolves"
 Making Of "Dance with the Wolves"
 "The Same Star"
 Making Of "The Same Star"

Chart performance

External links

References

Ruslana albums
2008 compilation albums
2008 video albums
Music video compilation albums
Warner Records compilation albums
Warner Records video albums